An Phú may refer to several places in Vietnam, including:

An Phú District, a rural district of An Giang Province
An Phú, District 2, a ward of District 2, Ho Chi Minh City
An Phú, Cần Thơ, a ward of Ninh Kiều District
An Phú, Quảng Nam, a ward of Tam Kỳ
An Phú, An Khê, a ward of An Khê in Gia Lai Province
An Phú, Bình Dương, a ward of Thuận An
An Phú (township), a township and capital of An Phú District
An Phú, Hanoi, a commune of Mỹ Đức District
An Phú, Củ Chi, a commune of Củ Chi District in Ho Chi Minh City
An Phú, Pleiku, a commune of Pleiku in Gia Lai Province
An Phú, Phú Yên, a commune of Tuy Hòa
An Phú, Bình Phước, a commune of Hớn Quản District
An Phú, Yên Bái, a commune of Lục Yên District
An Phú, Tịnh Biên, a commune of Tịnh Biên District